Tawala's Last Redoubt is a strategy video game developed and published by Broderbund for the Apple II in 1981 as the fourth and final entry in the Galactic Saga series.

Gameplay

Reception

Tawala's Last Redoubt was "highly recommended" by Hartley G. Lesser of Byte Magazine.

Reviews
Jeux & Stratégie #19

References

External links
Tawala's Last Redoubt at MobyGames

1981 video games
Apple II-only games
Apple II games
Broderbund games
Science fiction video games
Single-player video games
Video games featuring female protagonists
Video game sequels